Penha de França, O.A.D. (1649–1702) was a Roman Catholic prelate who served as Bishop of São Tomé e Príncipe (1699–1702).

Biography
Penha de França was born in  Lisbon, Portugal on 6 Nov 1649 and ordained a priest in the Ordo Augustiniensium Discalceatorum.
On 5 Oct 1699, he was appointed during the papacy of Pope Innocent XII as Bishop of São Tomé e Príncipe.
On 29 Jun 1700, he was consecrated bishop by João Franco de Oliveira, Archbishop of São Salvador da Bahia. 
He served as Bishop of São Tomé e Príncipe until his death in 1702.

References 

17th-century Roman Catholic bishops in Africa
18th-century Roman Catholic bishops in São Tomé and Príncipe
Bishops appointed by Pope Innocent XII
1649 births
1702 deaths
People from Lisbon
Discalced Augustinian bishops
Portuguese Roman Catholic bishops in Africa
Roman Catholic bishops of São Tomé and Príncipe